Slonim District is a district (rajon) in Grodno Region of Belarus.

The administrative center is Slonim.

Notable residents 

 Michał Wołłowicz (1806, Parečča estate — 1833) - participant of the November Uprising

References

 
Districts of Grodno Region